Neil Bristow (born 23 November 1955) is  a former Australian rules footballer who played with Footscray in the Victorian Football League (VFL). 	

Originally from Ainslie Football Club in the Australian Capital Territory Football League (ACTFL), Bristow played for Latrobe Valley Football League (LVFL) club Sale before Footscray recruited him for the 1979 VFL season. Bristow made his senior VFL debut in Round One, against Melbourne at the Melbourne Cricket Ground (MCG). Bristow played ten games in 1979, the last of which in Round 14, and left Footscray at the end of the season.

Notes

External links 		
		

		
		
		
		
		
Living people		
1955 births		
		
Australian rules footballers from Victoria (Australia)		
Western Bulldogs players
Ainslie Football Club players
Sale Football Club players